Akasaka may refer to:

Places
Akasaka Palace, which functions today as the State Guest-House
Akasaka, Tokyo, a district of Minato, Tokyo
Akasaka Sacas, a facility in Akasaka, Tokyo
Akasaka, Okayama, a town in the Akaiwa District, Okayama
Akasaka-juku (Nakasendō), a post town on the Nakasendō
Akasaka-juku (Tōkaidō), a post town on the Tōkaidō
A district of Chihayaakasaka, Osaka, Japan

Other uses
Akasaka (surname)
Akaneiro ni Somaru Saka, a visual novel by Feng adapted into an anime series

See also
 
 Moto-Akasaka, a district in Tokyo, part of Minato ward
 Akasa (disambiguation)